Two submarines of the United States Navy have been named USS Carp:

 
 

United States Navy ship names